A slime ball or slimeball may be:
 the medium of transmission for a lancet fluke
 Slimeballs, a book series
 a material obtained in Minecraft

See also
slime (disambiguation)
underhand (disambiguation)